Tabsur, also Khirbat 'Azzun, was a Palestinian village located 19 kilometres southwest of Tulkarm. In 1931, the village had 218 houses and an elementary school for boys.  Its Palestinian population was expelled during the 1948 Arab-Israeli war.

History
Tabsur was established before the middle of the nineteenth-century on an archaeological site.  The village contained archaeological remains, including the foundations of a building, a well, fragments of mosaic pavement, and tombs.

In the late nineteenth century, Tabsur  was described as a moderate-sized  hamlet  with a well to the north. It was later classified as a hamlet by the Palestine Index Gazetteer.

British Mandate era
During the British Mandate an elementary school for boys was established in the village. The village also had a few shops.

In the 1922 census of Palestine there were 709 villagers; 700 Muslims and 9 Christians, (where the Christians were all Orthodox,) increasing in  1931 census  to 994; 980 Muslims and 14 Christians, in  218  houses.

In the 1944/45 statistics, a total of 1,602 dunums were allocated to cereals, while 24 dunums were irrigated or used for orchards. 29 dunams were classified as built-up (urban) area.

1948, aftermath
The Arabs of Tabsur were ordered to leave by the Haganah on 3 April 1948, as part of Haganas policy of clearing out  the  Arab villages on the coastal plain. The villagers left on 16 April 1948.

Ra'anana was established south of Tabsur in 1921. Now a city, some of its suburbs have expanded into land that once belonged to the village. Batzra, founded in 1946 on village land, lies to the north.

In 1992, the Palestinian historian Walid Khalidi wrote: "The village has been completely  covered with Israeli citrus orchards, making it difficult to distinguish from the surrounding lands. Citrus and cypress trees grow on the village land."

The estimated number of Palestinian refugees from Tabsur in 1998 was 2,406.

See also
Azzun
Depopulated Palestinian locations in Israel

References

Bibliography

External links
Welcome To Tabsur
Tabsur (Khirbet 'Azzun), Zochrot
Survey of Western Palestine, Map 10:  IAA, Wikimedia commons 

Arab villages depopulated prior to the 1948 Arab–Israeli War
District of Tulkarm